Emurge is the widely bootlegged and unreleased demo album by American hip hop recording artist Hopsin. It is widely believed the project was recorded sometime in 2003 and was not a retail mixtape like other common mixtapes and the project was created for a local audience to create a buzz for the artist who at the time had decided to take rapping seriously, prior to rapping Hopsin had appeared in TV shows such as Malcolm in the Middle and That's So Raven among others. No official physical copies of Emurge have been found / sold online however in 2012 Hopsin's official YouTube account released all songs off Emurge for free. Throughout the years there have been many fake and misleading mixtapes also titled Emurge with other unreleased material on them. Songs such as "Break It Down" were later featured on Hopsin's official debut studio album Gazing at the Moonlight. This project is widely believed to be Hopsin's demo tape he used to show to various record labels to get him mainstream attention.

Track listing
All songs produced by Hopsin

References

2003 albums
Hopsin albums